The Korean American National Coordinating Council (Hangul: 재미동포전국연합회) is the largest nonprofit organization of Koreans residing in the United States with relationship with North Korea.

History 
This organization was founded by various organizations of Koreans in United States in New York in 1997. Prior to this, the organization "Korean Family and National Federation" was established in 1992 to organize groups of Korean-Americans to travel to North Korea.

Activities 
They own a news website "Minjok Tongshin", which has been accused of being a North Korean propaganda website and promote anti-semitism.

In 2018 they performed the concert “Peace Korea Concert” of Korean traditional music at the Kaufman Music Center.

Controversies 
In August 2015, the organization has been investigated for tax evasion by participating in prohibited activities.

References 

Korean-American society
North Korea–United States relations